Agathe Ngo Nack (born 2 March 1958) is a Cameroonian athlete. She competed in the women's discus throw at the 1984 Summer Olympics.

References

1958 births
Living people
Athletes (track and field) at the 1984 Summer Olympics
Cameroonian female discus throwers
Olympic athletes of Cameroon
Place of birth missing (living people)
20th-century Cameroonian women